Dion Yatras (born 26 August 1968) is a former Zimbabwean cricketer. A right-handed batsman and right-arm medium pace bowler, he played six first-class matches for Manicaland between 2000 and 2002.

He was born in Umtali (now Mutare), the son of Spiro Yatras.

References

External links
 
 

1969 births
Living people
Cricketers from Mutare
Manicaland cricketers
Zimbabwean cricketers